Astronaut/Cosmonaut is a mural by the French street artist Ash in the Kreuzberg district of Berlin.

It was painted in 2007 and measures 22x14 m. It is one of the most famous murals in Berlin and is considered a landmark and tourist attraction in Kreuzberg. It was made using a large stencil.

References

Additional reading
Mural Art, Kiriakos Losifidis, Publikat, 2008, ISBN 978-3-939566-22-9

Murals
Street art